The American 200 presented by Black's Tire and Auto Service was an ARCA Racing Series race that took place at Rockingham Speedway in 1973 and from 2008 until 2010. Charlie Glotzbach won the inaugural event, while Ty Dillon won the final event.

History 
During the inaugural race, Charlie Glotzbach led 285 laps out of 295 to win ahead of Charlie Blanton, who was two laps down. Before the race, only 13 cars were able to qualify before rain moved into the area, causing the remainder of the grid lined up according to sign-in time at the track. In 2008, Joey Logano won after taking the pole position and leading 257 laps out of 312. In 2009 Sean Caisse won the spring event, and Parker Kligerman won in the fall.  The final race was held in 2010, and was won by Ty Dillon.

Past winners

References

External links 
 Racing-Reference.info – Rockingham Speedway

ARCA Menards Series races
Motorsport in North Carolina
1973 establishments in North Carolina